Molla Qorbani (also Romanized as Mollā Qorbānī; also known as Sarāb-e Mollā Qorbānī and Seyl Mollā Qorbānī) is a village in Beyranvand-e Jonubi Rural District, Bayravand District, Khorramabad County, Lorestan Province, Iran. At the 2006 census, its population was 52, in 12 families.

References 

Towns and villages in Khorramabad County